Melvin is an unincorporated community in Richland Township, Clinton County, Ohio, United States.

History
Melvin had its start in 1883 when the railroad was extended to that point.

Gallery

References

Unincorporated communities in Clinton County, Ohio
Unincorporated communities in Ohio